El Año de la Peste is a Mexican motion picture categorized as drama, thriller and sci-fi. It was filmed in 1978 and released in 1979. The production counted with the famous Colombian writer Gabriel García Márquez for the adapted screenplay from the novel of Daniel Defoe A Journal of the Plague Year published in March 1722.

Synopsis
A dreadful sickness is found in a Mexican town. A doctor tries to alert the authorities when he discovers its epidemic nature. No one listens to him and soon the illness spreads. The government tries to manage the information in order to prevent terror.

Cast
 Alejandro Parodi as Dr. Pedro Sierra Genovés
 José Carlos Ruiz as Dr. Jorge Martínez Abasolo
 Rebeca Silva as Eva Aponte
 Tito Junco as President of Mexico
 Ignacio Retes as Dr. Mario Zermeño
 Eduardo Alcaraz as Dr. Luis Mario Zavala
 Héctor Godoy as Luis Armando Torreros
 Humberto Elizondo as R. C. Jiménez
 Leonor Llausás as Álvaro's widow
 Zully Keith as Magadalena
 Nora Larraga as Health inspector
 Arlette Pacheco as News reporter
 María Barber as President's wife
 Daniela Romo as Laura

Awards

References

External links
 

1978 films
1970s Spanish-language films
1978 drama films
Films set in Mexico
Films directed by Felipe Cazals
Films based on British novels
Mexican science fiction drama films
Films about viral outbreaks
1970s science fiction drama films
1970s Mexican films